Aleksandra Olsza defeated Tamarine Tanasugarn in the final, 7–5, 7–6(8–6) to win the girls' singles tennis title at the 1995 Wimbledon Championships.

Seeds

  Yvette Basting (second round)
  Anna Kournikova (semifinals)
  Annabel Ellwood (third round)
  Ludmila Varmužová (third round)
  Tamarine Tanasugarn (final)
  Siobhan Drake-Brockman (second round)
  Amélie Cocheteux (second round)
 n/a
  Aleksandra Olsza (champion)
  Jitka Schönfeldová (second round)
  Denisa Chládková (first round)
  Kira Nagy (second round)
  Lilia Osterloh (third round)
  Barbara Schwartz (quarterfinals)
  Miriam D'Agostini (first round)
 n/a

Draw

Finals

Top half

Section 1

Section 2

Bottom half

Section 3

Section 4

References

External links

Girls' Singles
Wimbledon Championship by year – Girls' singles